A mission statement is a short statement of why an organization exists, what its overall goal is, the goal of its operations: what kind of product or service it provides, its primary customers or market, and its geographical region of operation. It may include a short statement of such fundamental matters as the organization's values or philosophies, a business's main competitive advantages, or a desired future state—the "vision".  Historically it is associated with Christian religious groups; indeed, for many years, a missionary was assumed to be a person on a specifically religious mission. The word "mission" dates from 1598, originally of Jesuits sending ("missio", Latin for "act of sending") members abroad.

A mission is not simply a description of an organization by an external party, but an expression, made by an organization's leaders, of their desires and intent for the organization. A mission statement aims to communicate the organisation's purpose and direction to its employees, customers, vendors, and other stakeholders. A mission statement also creates a sense of  identity for employees. Organizations normally do not change their mission statements over time, since they define their continuous, ongoing purpose and focus.

According to Chris Bart, professor of strategy and governance at McMaster University, a commercial mission statement consists of three essential components:

 key market: the target audience
 contribution: the product or service
 distinction: what makes the product unique or why the audience should buy it over another

Bart estimates that in practice, only about ten percent of mission statements say something meaningful. For this reason, such statements are widely regarded with contempt.

Purpose 

Although the notion of business purpose may transcend that of a mission statement, the sole purpose of a commercial mission statement is to summarize a company's main goal/agenda, it outlines in brief terms what the goal of a company is. Some generic examples of mission statements would be, "To provide the best service possible within the banking sector for our customers." or "To provide the best experience for all of our customers." The reason why businesses make use of mission statements is to make it clear what they look to achieve as an organization, not only to themselves and their employees but to the customers and other people who are a part of the business, such as shareholders. As a company evolves, so will their mission statement. This is to make sure that the company remains on track and to ensure that the mission statement does not lose its touch and become boring or stale.

It is important that a mission statement is not confused with a vision statement. As discussed earlier, the main purpose of a mission statement is to get across the ambitions of an organisation in a short and simple fashion; it is not necessary to go into detail for the mission statement which is evident in examples given. The reason why it is important that a mission statement and vision statement are not confused is because they both serve different purposes. Vision statements tend to be more related to strategic planning and lean more towards discussing where a company aims to be in the future.

Religious mission statements are less explicit about key market, contribution and distinction, but clearly describe the organization's purpose. For example: "Peoples Church is called to proclaim the Gospel of Christ and the beliefs of the evangelical Christian faith, to maintain the worship of God, and to inspire in all persons a love for Christ, a passion for righteousness, and a consciousness of their duties to God and their fellow human beings. We pledge our lives to Christ and covenant with each other to demonstrate His Spirit through worship, witnessing, and ministry to the needs of the people of this church and the community."

Advantages 
Provides direction: Mission statements are a way to direct a business into the right path. They play a part in helping the business make better decisions which can be beneficial to them. Without the mission statement providing direction, businesses may struggle when it comes to making decisions and planning for the future. This is why providing direction could be considered one of the most advantageous points of a mission statement.

Clear purpose: Having a clear purpose can remove any potential ambiguities that may surround the existence of a business. People who are interested in the progression of the business, such as stakeholders, will want to know that the business is making the right choices and progressing more towards achieving their goals, which will help to remove any doubt the stakeholders may have in the business.

A mission statement can act as a motivational tool within an organisation, and it can allow employees to all work towards one common goal that benefits both the organisation and themselves. This can help with factors such as employee satisfaction and productivity. It is important that employees feel a sense of purpose. Giving them this sense of purpose will allow them to focus more on their daily tasks and help them realise the goals of the organisation and their role.

Disadvantages 

Although it is mostly beneficial for a business to craft a good mission statement, there are some situations where a mission statement can be considered pointless or not useful to a business.

Unrealistic: In most cases, mission statements turn out to be unrealistic and far too optimistic. An unrealistic mission statement can also affect the performance and morale of the employees within the workplace. This is because an unrealistic mission statement would reduce the likelihood of employees being able to meet this standard which could demotivate employees in the long term. Unrealistic mission statements also serve no purpose and can be considered a waste of management's time. Another issue which could arise from an unrealistic mission statement is that poor decisions could be made in an attempt to achieve this goal which has the potential to harm the business and be seen as a waste of both time and resources.

Waste of time and resources: Mission statements require planning. This takes time and effort for those who are responsible for creating the mission statement. If the mission statement is not achieved, then the process of creating the mission statement could be seen as a waste of time for all of the people involved. A lot of thought and time can be spent in designing a good mission statement, and to have all of that time wasted is not what businesses can afford. The wasted time could have been spent on much more important tasks within the organisation such as decision-making for the business.

Design 
According to an independent contributor to Forbes, the following questions must be answered in the mission statement:
 “What do we do?” — The mission statement should clearly outline the main purpose of the organisation, and what they do.
 “How do we do it?” — It should also mention how one plans on achieving the mission statement.
 “Whom do we do it for?” — The audience of the mission statement should be clearly stated within the mission statement.
 “What value are we bringing?” — The benefits and values of the mission statement should be clearly outlined.

When designing a mission statement, it should be very clear to the audience what the purpose of it is. It is ideal for a business to be able to communicate their mission, goals and objectives to the reader without including any unnecessary information through the mission statement. 

Richard Branson has commented on ways of crafting a good mission statement; he explains the importance of having a mission statement that is clear and straight to the point and does not contain unnecessary baffling. He went on to analyse a mission statement, using Yahoo's mission statement at the time (2013) as an example. In his evaluation of the mission statement, he seemed to suggest that while the statement sounded interesting, most people would not be able to understand the message it is putting across. In other words, the message of the mission statement potentially meant nothing to the audience.

See also 
 Strategic planning
 Strategy Markup Language
 Vision statement

References

External links 

Statements
Business terms
Strategic management
[mission vission]